Wynyard/W. B. Needham Field Aerodrome , also known as Wynyard Memorial Airport, is located  north of Wynyard, Saskatchewan, Canada.

See also 
 List of airports in Saskatchewan

References

External links

Registered aerodromes in Saskatchewan
Big Quill No. 308, Saskatchewan